The 2014–15 San Jose State Spartans women's basketball team represented San José State University during the 2014–15 NCAA Division I women's basketball season. The Spartans, led by second-year head coach Jamie Craighead, played their home games at the Event Center Arena and were members of the Mountain West Conference.

Roster

Schedule

|-
!colspan=9 style="background:#005a8b; color:#c79900;"| Exhibition

|-
!colspan=9 style="background:#005a8b; color:#c79900;"| Non-conference regular season

|-
!colspan=9 style="background:#005a8b; color:#c79900;"| Mountain West regular season

|-
!colspan=9 style="background:#005a8b; color:#c79900;"| Mountain West Women's Tournament

References

External links
2014-15 roster 
2014-15 statistics

San Jose State
San Jose State Spartans women's basketball seasons